Asimadoline (EMD-61753) is an experimental drug which acts as a peripherally selective κ-opioid receptor (KOR) agonist. Because of its low penetration across the blood–brain barrier, asimadoline lacks the psychotomimetic effects of centrally acting KOR agonists, and consequently was thought to have potential for medical use.  It has been studied as a possible treatment for irritable bowel syndrome, with reasonable efficacy seen in clinical trials, but it has never been approved or marketed.

See also
 Eluxadoline
 Fedotozine
 Nalfurafine
 Trimebutine

References

Synthetic opioids
Kappa-opioid receptor agonists
Pyrrolidines
Acetamides
Peripherally selective drugs
Abandoned drugs